"What's It Gonna Be?!" is the second single released by American rapper Busta Rhymes from his third studio album E.L.E. (Extinction Level Event): The Final World Front (1998), featuring guest vocals from American singer Janet Jackson. The song was a commercial and critical success, reaching number three on the Billboard Hot 100 and the top ten of various countries. It also hit number one on the Billboard Hot Rap Tracks and Hot R&B/Hip-Hop Singles & Tracks charts, and was nominated for a Grammy Award for Best Rap Performance by a Duo or Group at the 2000 Grammy Awards.

The music video, directed by Rhymes & Hype Williams, was critically lauded, and received four MTV Video Music Awards nominations at the 1999 MTV Video Music Awards. It is one of the most expensive music videos ever made.

The song appears on Rhymes' compilation albums Total Devastation: The Best of Busta Rhymes and Turn It Up! The Very Best of Busta Rhymes as well as Jackson's Number Ones greatest hits album.

Jackson included the song as an interlude on her Number Ones: Up Close and Personal tour and sang it for the first time on the second leg of her 2018 State of the World Tour.

Music video
The music video for the song was directed by Hype Williams on March 12, 1999. It is one of the most expensive videos ever made, costing upwards of $2 million, and focused largely on special effects. The video begins with a glass of a silver liquid  moving toward the edge of its resting area, which spills and transforms into Busta Rhymes as a knight in shining armor and begins rapping. Jackson is portrayed as a dominatrix, in a purple latex suit adorned with cock rings, nail piercings, and baring her cleavage.

The video contains frequent sexual innuendo, visually based on the song's lyrical themes, portraying imagery alluding to wet dreams and stimulated wetness. Jackson appears in a liquid tunnel as Rhymes morphs into a sperm-like creature and floats towards her. A marching band of miniature Rhymes passes through the tunnel's walls as Rhymes transforms into one himself, before morphing again to rise through the tunnel's ceiling. Electric sparks fly as miniature versions of himself pour like raindrops onto Jackson's breasts. Towards the finale, Rhymes and Jackson are united to perform together, as their bodies rub up on each other. The remaining scenery then combusts into little as they continue transforming into a silver liquid.

Track listings

US - 12" vinyl Maxi Single
A1. What's It Gonna Be?! (LP Version - Dirty) (5:28)
A2. What's It Gonna Be?! (Instrumental) (5:28)
A3. What's It Gonna Be?! (LP Version Clean - Edit) (4:19)
B1. What's It Gonna Be?! (LP Version - Clean) (5:28)
B2. What's It Gonna Be?! (Instrumental) (5:28)

Germany 5" CD Single

What's It Gonna Be?! (Soul Society Remix) (3:56)
What's It Gonna Be?! (LP Version Clean-Edit) (4:04)
What's It Gonna Be?! (Micky Finn D&B Remix) (5:59)

US 5" CD Single
What's It Gonna Be?! (LP Version Clean - Edit) (4:09)
What's It Gonna Be?! (LP Version Clean) (5:29)

UK - Cassette Single
A1. What's It Gonna Be?! (LP Version Clean - Edit) (4:09)
A2. What's It Gonna Be?! (Soul Society Remix) (3:53)
B1. What's It Gonna Be?! (LP Version Clean - Edit) (4:09)
B2. What's It Gonna Be?! (Soul Society Remix) (3:53)

Charts and certifications
The song peaked at number three on the Billboard Hot 100 and reached number one on both the Hot R&B/Hip-Hop Singles & Tracks and Hot Rap Tracks charts. It also reached number five on the Rhythmic Top 40. It was a top ten hit in the United Kingdom, Australia, and South Africa.  It was a moderate success in Europe, reaching the top forty in most countries. The song sold 800,000 copies in the United States and was certified Gold by the RIAA. The single entered at #1 on the UK R&B Singles chart.

Weekly charts

Year-end charts

Certifications

|}

See also
 R&B number-one hits of 1999 (USA)
 List of most expensive music videos

References

1999 singles
Busta Rhymes songs
Dirty rap songs
Janet Jackson songs
Music videos directed by Hype Williams
Songs written by Busta Rhymes
Elektra Records singles
1998 songs
Songs written by Darrell "Delite" Allamby